Delias argenthona, the scarlet Jezebel or northern Jezebel (also spelled as Jezabel), is a medium-sized butterfly of the family Pieridae found in Australia. Its caterpillars feed on mistletoe.

References

Butterflies of Australia
argenthona
Butterflies described in 1793